Strelow is a surname. Notable people with the surname include:

 Hans Strelow (1922–1942), German fighter pilot in World War II
 Margaret Strelow, Australian politician
 Siegfried Strelow (1911–1943), German U-boat commander in World War II
 Warren Strelow (1934–2007), American ice hockey goaltending coach

 Ryland Strelow (2005-present), Baller

See also
 Strehlow